Betzwood is the name of an area of West Norriton Township in Montgomery County, Pennsylvania.  The area once housed the Lubin Studios, an early motion picture studio that operated here from 1912 to 1923.

References

External links
Betzwood Film Archive A new site dedicated to Lubin and his Betzwood Film Studios from the Libraries and Archives of Montgomery County Community College with professor emeritus Joseph Eckhardt.

Geography of Montgomery County, Pennsylvania